Egypt competed at the 2013 Mediterranean Games in Mersin, Turkey from the 20th to 30 June 2013.

Archery 

Men

Women

Athletics 

Men
Track & road events

Field events

Badminton

Basketball

Men's tournament

Team 

Wael Badr
Ahmed Hesham
Ibrahim El-Gammal
Shreef Geneidy
Yousef Shousha
Ibrahim Abo Khadra
Mohamed El-Kerdany
Asem Marei
Haitham Kamal
Ahmed El-Sabbagh
Mohamed Khorshid
Ramy Abdellah

Standings

Results

Boxing 

Men

Canoeing

Fencing 

Men

Women

Handball 

Men's Tournament - 1 team of 16 athletes

Sailing 

Men

Swimming 

Men

Women

Volleyball

Men's tournament

Standings

Results

References

Nations at the 2013 Mediterranean Games
2013
Mediterranean Games